Arar Domestic Airport is an airport serving Arar (also spelled ʿArʿar), the capital of Northern Borders Province in Saudi Arabia. It began operations on 1 June 1981.

Facilities

Airlines and destinations

Passenger

See also 

 List of airports in Saudi Arabia
 Saudia 
 King Abdulaziz International Airport

References

External links
 
 
 

1981 establishments in Saudi Arabia
Airports established in 1981
Airports in Saudi Arabia
Arar, Saudi Arabia